Herbert Richard Scriven (2 February 1908 – 2001) was an English professional footballer who played as a goalkeeper for Southampton in the 1930s.

Football career
Scriven was born in Winsor on the edge of the New Forest and started his football career with local non-league sides Andover and Totton before he joined Southampton in December 1929.

He made his first-team debut when he took over from the veteran Willie White for the fourth match of the 1930–31 Second Division season on 8 September 1930, a 2–1 defeat at Oldham Athletic. Scriven soon became established as first-choice goalkeeper although he lost his place to White for the last eight matches of the season. White retained the No. 1 shirt for the first seven matches of the following season, before Scriven claimed it back in September 1931. From then on, Scriven rarely missed a match over the next two and a half years until February 1934 when manager George Kay replaced him with the 20-year-old Billy Light. Scriven was recalled when Light displaced his left knee cap in a collision after only four matches, and retained the goalkeeper's shirt until March 1935 when, after a run of eight matches without a victory, Kay once again replaced him with Light.

In March 1936, Light was sold to West Bromwich Albion for a fee of £2,000 to help reduce the club's debts, and Scriven was once again recalled to the side. He retained his place as first-choice custodian until he retired in the summer of 1937. In his seven seasons with the Saints, Scriven made a total of 233 first-team appearances.

Later life
Following his retirement, Scriven became the licensee at the Bear and Ragged Staff pub at Michelmersh, near Romsey. During this time, he made a few appearances for Salisbury City.

After World War II, he moved to a farm near Marlow where he was still living in 1992.

References

External links
Video of Scriven training with Southampton in 1934
Bear and Ragged Staff website

1908 births
2001 deaths
People from New Forest District
English footballers
Association football goalkeepers
English Football League players
Southampton F.C. players
Andover F.C. players
A.F.C. Totton players
Salisbury City F.C. (1905) players